Hormasji Vajifdar (2 December 1894 – 24 March 1961) was an Indian cricketer who played first-class cricket from 1913 to 1937. 

A right-handed middle-order batsman and right-arm medium-fast bowler, Vajifdar played in the final of the 1934–35 Ranji Trophy, the trophy's inaugural season, for Bombay, scoring 21 and 71 and taking 2 for 44 and 8 for 40 in Bombay's victory. In the final of the 1935–36 Ranji Trophy he captained Bombay to a second title.

References

External links
 

1894 births
1961 deaths
Indian cricketers
Mumbai cricketers
Cricketers from Mumbai
Parsees cricketers